Bhagya Reddy Varma (22 May 1888 – 18 February 1939) was an Indian political leader, social reformer and activist. He fought against untouchability in Hyderabad State. He also fought for abolition of Jogini and Devdasi systems.

Early life
Reddy was born in Mala caste to Madari Venkaiah and Julia Ragmamba in the Princely State of Hyderabad.

Movements
Before B.R Ambedkar Varma started his movement and after it was inspired by B. R. Ambedkar and Jyotirao Phule, Varma raised his voice against discrimination by upper castes. Eventually, he also established the Adi Hindu ("Original Hindu"), a social organisation, to bring awareness to the Dalits. In 1906, he formed a group called Jagan Mitra Mandali, which involved Dalits and Malas, and started telling stories by 'Hari Katha' (popular folklore). In 1910, he started to educate Dalit children, and in a short span of time he was able to run 25 centres with 2000 students.

 1911 Adi Hindu social services started 
 1912 promoted Buddhism

In 1917, in a conference at Vijayawada town, the Pratam Andhra - Adi Hindu meeting was held. In the same year, Bhagya Reddy Verma's speech attracted much to M.K Gandhi's attention at the 'Akhila Bharata Hindu' Round Table Conference in Calcutta. In 1919 a meeting was held with Jangamulu, Dasulu, Mulnavasi, for the Adi Hindu beneficial program. The purpose of this event was to resolve the internal issues in the Dalit community; he even insisted that the panchayat court system be rebuilt. The first Adi Hindu conference was held in 1921 in Hyderabad led by T.J. Papanna.

In 1925, in a conference led by N.M.R. Mukund Reddy which had been officially allotted to him as chief head who led this meeting successfully. In same year, the Adi Hindu Hand Skills Exhibition was held to showcase the Dalits skills. Bhagya Reddy also campaigned on many social issues, e.g - Child Marriage, Black Magic, Women Education, Alcohol prohibition etc. His work spread to the neighboring states of Karnataka, Tamil Nadu, Maharashtra and Andhra; from there some well known people joined and followed the revolution.

In 1930, in an historical speech he announced bringing Dalit issues to British notice in the upcoming All India Round Table Conference at Lucknow in the same year. He proposed to send Dr. B. R. Ambedkar to lead the group. The agenda was to recognize the Dalits as Adi Hindu, rather than untouchables, Mala or Madiga.

In 1931, the Nizam government came forward to agree with the demands of Reddy, and registered the Dalits as Adi Hindus in the general elections. Nizam Osman Ali Khan, Asaf Jah VII praised Reddy for his social work, and recognised it with an award. Later, the Nizam appointed Varma as the chief adviser to his government. Adi Hindu Bhavan at Chadarghat, Hyderabad had been the platform for many revolutionary meetings. It is said that he gave nearly 3,348 speeches.

The Bhagya Memorial Girls High School at Esamia Bazar, Koti, Hyderabad, Telangana, which he started in 1913, is still functioning.

Reddy had launched a movement against the devadasi pratha, forcing the Nizam to declare it a crime.

During the Telangana Movement in 2017, the students of Telangana region wanted to rename the G. M. C. Balayogi Athletic Stadium at Gachibowli as Bhagya Reddy Varma Stadium.

Honour
In 1913, Arya Samaj organised a function to honour Bhagya Reddy Varma with the title Varma.

References

Converts to Buddhism
Dalit activists
Indian Buddhists
Indian politicians
Buddhist activists
Activists from Telangana
1888 births
1950 deaths